The Lost Romance is a surviving 1921 American silent drama film directed by William C. deMille and starring Jack Holt and Lois Wilson. It was produced by Famous Players-Lasky and distributed by Paramount Pictures.

A copy is held by The Library of Congress.

Cast
Jack Holt as Mark Sheridan
Lois Wilson as Sylvia Hayes
Fontaine La Rue as Elizabeth Erskine
Conrad Nagel as Allen Erskine, M.D.
Michael D. Moore as Allen Erskine Jr.
Mayme Kelso as Librarian
Robert Brower as Butler
Barbara Gurney as Nurse
Clarence Geldart as Police Lieutenant
Clarence Burton as Detective
Lillian Leighton as Matilda

References

External links

Lobby poster
Jack Holt coming attraction poster;The California Theatre,Lobby poster

1921 films
American silent feature films
Films directed by William C. deMille
Paramount Pictures films
1921 drama films
Silent American drama films
American black-and-white films
1920s American films